Velsen-Zuid is a town in the Dutch province of North Holland. It is a part of the municipality of Velsen, and lies about 9 km north of Haarlem.

Velsen-Zuid developed around the church founded by Willibrord in the 8th century. Between 1865 and 1876, the North Sea Canal was dug and Velsen became two settlements.

References

External ilnk

Velsen
Populated places in North Holland